The Center for Cartoon Studies (CCS) is a two-year institution focusing on sequential art, specifically comics and graphic novels Located in the village of White River Junction, in the town of Hartford, Vermont, the Center offers a Master of Fine Arts degree, both one and two-year certificate programs, as well as summer programs, and is "the only college-level training program of its kind in the United States."

History 
The Center for Cartoon Studies was founded by cartoonist James Sturm and Michelle Ollie in 2004, with its first class of 18 students beginning their schooling in the Fall of 2005. The first class of students were accepted less on the quality of their drawing and more on their critical thinking skills, literary merit, storytelling abilities and curiosity.

The Center's first commencement took place on May 19, 2007, with roughly 20 students graduating. In 2007 CCS was approved by the State of Vermont to award Master of Fine Arts degrees and certificates, which have been awarded to students from all subsequent classes. It currently has a student body of 48 students with an average age of 24. About 20 new students are accepted each year.

The school educates students to be proficient in all aspects of graphic design and production, including self-publication and promotion.  This is a notable step away from the specialized production model of mainstream comics companies such as Marvel Comics and DC Comics, wherein writing, pencilwork, inking, coloring, and lettering are most often handled by separate individuals.  This inclination is in part due to many of the faculty's and significant donor Peter Laird's experience with alternative comics. The State of Vermont Department of Education approved CCS for degree granting authority and the school is also a member of Vermont Higher Education Council.

Campus 

The Center for Cartoon Studies currently operates out of two buildings in the historic district of White River Junction, Vermont. The school rents space in the former Colodny’s Surprise Department Store Building, and in December 2011 the school purchased a former Post Office a few buildings down from Department Store Building. The schools Schulz Library used to be housed in a former fire station on Bridge Street, a building also occupied by the Main Street Museum, but had to be evacuated in August 2011 due to flood waters from Hurricane Irene.

Colodny’s Surprise Department Store 
All the main operational and educational facilities of the Center for Cartoon Studies are located in the former Colodny’s Surprise Department Store Building. Built in 1929, the building is the only Art Deco building in downtown White River Junction, and is built partially with Antique Verde marble quarried from Rochester, Vermont. CCS inhabits the first floor and basement of the building and includes multiple offices, a classroom, and an "open basement studio."

Post Office 
The Former Post office Building in downtown White River Junction was purchased by the school in December 2011. The brick building is constructed in a colonial revival architectural style and was built in 1934 as a Works Progress Administration structure. This building will become the main structure for the Center for Cartoon Studies and includes classrooms, faculty offices and lounges, and the Schulz Library. The top floor of the Post Office Building is still rented to the current tenants. It also includes studio space for the Inky Solomon Center, a grant-program geared towards CCS alumni, their comics and community outreach.

Schulz Library 

The Schulz Library, named after Charles M. Schulz is the official library of the Center for Cartoon Studies and currently houses over 9,000 titles in one room. The Library is currently in storage, but was previously housed in the former Bridge Street firehouse, owned by the Main Street Museum. The material in the library had to be evacuated in August 2011 due to flood waters from Hurricane Irene. The Library's collection focuses on comic books, graphic novels, as well as "books about cartooning – both academic and instructional." The Schulz's collection has grown largely from donations from collectors and publishers, as well as artists. By the fall semester of 2012 the Schulz library will be moved to the Post Office Building the CCS purchased in 2011.

Special collections located at the Library include collections of gag cartoons, classic newspaper comic strips, Zines and mini-comics, and a large collection of rare and hard to find Peanuts books, as well as "a near-complete run of The Comics Journal." Many hard-to-find titles and previews of student work are featured on the Schulz Library Blog.

Academics 
The Center For Cartoon Studies offers a Master of Fine Arts degree, both one and two-year certificate programs, as well as summer programs.

Each term, roughly 14 well known cartoon artists and others in the field come to CCS as visiting faculty and guest lecturers. The visiting faculty lecture, critique, and discuss with students of the school the student work and their own. Past visiting faculty have included Alison Bechdel, Ed Brubaker, Ivan Brunetti, James Kochalka, Jason Lutes, Scott McCloud, Seth, Art Spiegelman, Craig Thompson, and Chris Ware.

A senior Thesis is required at the Center, which usually involves the creation of a full scale graphic novel or a full year's worth of work.

Notable persons 
In addition to Sturm, Stephen R. Bissette, Jason Lutes and Alec Longstreth are permanent faculty. For the 2011–2012 school year, cartoonist and animator Robert Sikoryak joined the faculty.

Students and alumni from the Center for Cartoon Studies have received Ignatz Awards, Eisner Award nominations and Xeric Foundation grants for their work. One alumni, who launched their drag career while attending the school, has won RuPaul's Drag Race.

 Robyn Chapman - CCS Fellowship, Xeric Foundation grant, Theater of the Meek
 Charles Forsman - 2013 Ignatz Award for Outstanding Minicomic The End of the Fucking World, 2008 Ignatz Awards for Outstanding Comic and Outstanding Series Snake Oil
Colleen Frakes - Xeric Foundation grant, Tragic Relief, 2009 Ignatz Award, Promising New Talent, Woman King
 Alexis Frederick Frost - Xeric Foundation grant, La Primavera
 Samuel Gaskin - Xeric Foundation grant, Pizza Wizard
 Alex Kim - Xeric Foundation grant, Wall City
 Alec Longstreth- CCS Fellowship, 2005 Ignatz Award for Outstanding Minicomic (Phase 7), 2007 Ignatz Award for Outstanding Debut Comic (Papercutter #6)
 Annie Murphy - Xeric Foundation grant, I Still Live: Biography of a Spiritualist
 Gabby "Ken Dahl" Schulz - CCS Fellowship, 2007 Ignatz Award Best Mini-Comic, Monsters, 2010 Ignatz Award Best Story, Monsters. 2010 Eisner Award nominee, Best Reality-Based Work for Monsters.
 James Sturm - 2010 Ignatz Award Outstanding Graphic Novel, Market Day
 Melissa Mendes - Xeric Foundation grant, Freddie
 Laura Terry - Xeric Foundation grant, Overboard
 Tillie Walden - 2016 Eisner Nomination Best Single Issue/One Shot, I Love This Part, 2017 Eisner nomination for Best Digital Comic, On a Sunbeam
 Sasha Velour - Winner of RuPaul's Drag Race Season 9

Documentary 
CCS is the subject of a documentary film, Cartoon College, by Josh Melrod and Tara Wray. The film follows a group of CCS students from the 2008, 2009, 2010 and 2011 classes and includes interviews with notable faculty and luminaries. It has been screened at film festivals in California, Vancouver (Canada), Washington, Florida, Glasgow, Maryland and of course, White River Junction. Future shows include New York City, Atlanta and New Zealand.

See also 
 Billy Ireland Cartoon Library & Museum
 Charles M. Schulz Museum and Research Center

References

External links 
 official site
 Schulz Library Catalog 
 Schulz Library Blog
 journal/essay by Sturm about founding the school
 Visiting Faculty Blog
 Cartoon College Movie Official Blog

Comics-related organizations
Vermont culture
Educational institutions established in 2004
White River Junction, Vermont
Education in Windsor County, Vermont
2004 establishments in Vermont
Private universities and colleges in Vermont
Art schools in Vermont